Still Hungry is an album by the American heavy metal band Twisted Sister, released in 2004. The album is a re-recording of the 1984 album Stay Hungry, with seven bonus tracks. "Never Say Never" and "Blastin' Fast & Loud", were demoed during the original 1984 sessions, completed by the classic line-up in 2001 and recorded for the release of Club Daze Volume II: Live in the Bars in 2002. "Come Back", "Plastic Money", "You Know I Cry" and "Rock 'n' Roll Saviors" are brand new 2004 studio tracks. "Heroes Are Hard to Find" was originally recorded and released in 1998 by the reunited band for the soundtrack of Strangeland, a horror movie written by and starring frontman Dee Snider based on the character Captain Howdy from "Horror-Teria".

The version of "I Wanna Rock" from this album is featured in the video games Guitar Hero Encore: Rocks the 80s (2007) and Burnout Paradise (2008).

British rock band Cryogen have a song on their first album Daylight named “Still Hungry”, which they have confirmed is a reference to this album.

Reception

Alex Henderson of AllMusic suggested that casual listeners "start out with Stay Hungry, not Still Hungry", but he also added: "for collectors and hardcore fans, Still Hungry paints an enjoyable, interesting picture of the sound that Snider and friends originally had in mind for their most famous album."

Track listing

Personnel

Twisted Sister
Dee Snider - lead vocals
Jay Jay French - guitars, backing vocals
Eddie "Fingers" Ojeda - guitars, backing vocals
Mark "The Animal" Mendoza - bass, backing vocals
A. J. Pero - drums

Production
Jay Jay French - executive producer
Mark "The Animal" Mendoza - producer, mixing
Danny McNerney - engineer, mixing
Dylan Ely - assistant engineer
Joe Lambert - mastering
Phil Carson - executive producer

References

2004 remix albums
Twisted Sister albums
Spitfire Records albums